Patrick Shiu Kin-yin is a Hong Kong-Canadian doctor. He is the former chairman of the Hong Kong Democratic Foundation from 1992 and 1997 and former Election Committee member for Medical subsector elected in 1998. He is also a former core member of the Hong Kong Medical Association.

References

Living people
Hong Kong medical doctors
Hong Kong Democratic Foundation politicians
Members of the Election Committee of Hong Kong, 1998–2000
Year of birth missing (living people)